CPA Practice Advisor is a technology and practice management resource for accounting and tax professionals. It is offered in online digital and print versions, with six print issues per year (Feb, Apr, Jun, Aug, Oct, Dec) and 11 digital issues per year (Feb-Dec).

Overview 
The magazine was founded in 1991 as The CPA Software News; was renamed The CPA Technology Advisor in 2004, and was subsequently renamed CPA Practice Advisor in February 2011, with a stated purpose to "more closely align the publication and its digital offerings to the changing needs of the tax and accounting profession." The print version of the magazine is also distributed to certain professional organizations under the title NSA Practice Advisor (for the National Society of Accountants). 

Along with its website www.cpapracticeadvisor.com, CPA Practice Advisor is a print and online technology media outlet for practicing public accountants and tax professionals. It covers technology issues as they relate to those professionals and their accounting practices, and to their interaction with small businesses and individual clients. The media outlet offers print, online and e-book versions of its print content, along with online tools, apps, podcasts and webcasts (which qualify for CPA-required Continuing Professional Education (CPE).

Both online and print content of CPA Practice Advisor is focused on reviews and comparisons of technologies and workflow practices that can be beneficial to tax and accounting practices that serve multiple clients. Additional content includes topical features, implementation advice and serial columns contributed by members of the professional accounting community, many of whom hold credentials as a CPA (Certified Public Accountants), CPA.CITP (CPAs with the additional qualification of Certified Information Technology Professional), EA (Enrolled Agent recognized by the IRS to represent taxpayers), member of the NSA (National Society of Accountants), or PA (Professional Accountant).

The publication's core staff as of January 2022 includes: Barry Strobel, Publisher; Gail Perry, CPA, Editor-in-Chief; and Isaac M. O'Bannon, Managing Editor.

Corporate Oversight 
CPA Practice Advisor is a part of Endeavor Business Media. Previously, the publication was owned by media publisher Cygnus Business media, which was purchased by Endeavor in January 2019.

Circulation 
CPA Practice Advisor has a print circulation of approximately 45,000 tax and accounting professionals, including credentialed Certified Public Accountants (CPA), Enrolled Agents (EA), Professional Accountants (PA) and others in the professional tax preparation and accounting spaces. Online metrics note more than 200,000 unique pageviews per month (Per Google Analytics, January 25, 2022).

Content/Focus 
The technology reviews in CPA Practice Advisor include coverage of the latest installed, hosted and cloud-based technologies offered by companies such as Avalara, Thomson Reuters, CCH, a Wolters Kluwer business, Intuit, Microsoft, Sage Software, AccountantsWorld, FreshBooks and Fujitsu. Reviews and articles are written by leading accounting technology thought leaders, including Editor-in-Chief Gail Perry, CPA, a practicing public accountant and technology consultant for more than 30 years. 

Website content is more news-focused with frequent updates on tax law, news from the Internal Revenue Service, accounting standards changes, regulatory rulings, labor management and HR reporting issues, and other small business topics. Regular columns include:

Columns & Regular Features 

Apps We Love (Gail Perry, CPA, Editor-in-Chief),
From the Trenches (Randy Johnston, MCS, MCP),
The Staffing & HR Advisor (Paul McDonald),
Bridging the Gap (Jim Boomer, CPA.CITP),
The Millennial Advisor (Garrett Wagner, CPA.CITP),
The Labor Law Advisor (Richard D. Alaniz),
Technology IN Practice (Roman Kepczyk, CPA.CITP),
Marketing Your Firm (Becky Livingston), and
The Leadership Advisor (Amy Vetter, CPA.CITP, CGMA)

Special Events 
CPA Practice Advisor sponsors several special events and programs, including its annual Tax & Accounting Technology Innovation Awards, which were founded in 2004 to recognize advances in technologies that benefit the tax and accounting space. Honors are also presented annually to professionals in the field through the publication's 40 Under 40 program. Additional programs and events include the annual Thought Leader Symposium, Accounting Hall of Fame, Most Powerful Women in Accounting Awards, and the Readers' Choice Awards. In addition, the magazine sponsors an annual live streaming conference called Ensuring Success.

External links
 CPA Practice Advisor Website
 Ensuring Success Conference Website
 Cygnus Business Media Website
 Intuit Website
 Fujitsu Website
 FreshBooks Website
 AccountantsWorld Website
 Microsoft Website
 Internal Revenue Service Website
 Thomson Reuters Website
 Avalara Website

1991 establishments in Illinois
Accounting magazines
Business magazines published in the United States
Magazines established in 1991
Magazines published in Illinois